Lamb of God (Agnus Dei in Latin) is a term in Christian theology.

Lamb of God may also refer to:
 Agnus Dei, a prayer said during Mass
 The Lamb of God (book) by Sergei Bulgakov
 Lamb of God (band), an American metal band
 Lamb of God (album), by Lamb of God
 "Lamb of God", a song by Marilyn Manson from Holy Wood (In the Shadow of the Valley of Death)
 "Lamb of God", a contemporary hymn by Twila Paris 
 Lamb of God (film), a 2008 Argentine drama film
 "Lamb of God", an oratorio by Rob Gardner

See also 
 Agnus Dei (disambiguation)
 Lamb: The Gospel According to Biff, Christ's Childhood Pal, a 2002 novel about Jesus by Christopher Moore